Adam and Eve is a 1932 oil-on-panel painting by the Polish painter Tamara de Lempicka. It is in the Art Deco style and depicts a male nude embracing a female nude who holds an apple. In the background are stylized skyscrapers.

Description
Lempicka was fond of repeating stories about the creation of Adam and Eve. The inspiration for this painting arose when a professional female model took a break to eat an apple. Lempicka asked her to hold the pose and started to sketch. She then invited a policeman who was making his rounds in the streets to pose for Adam.

The inspiration for this painting arose when a professional female model took a break to eat an apple. Lempicka asked her to hold the pose and started to sketch. She then invited a policeman who was making his rounds in the streets to pose for Adam. Lempicka contrasts the natural beauty of human bodies beauty with a barren, industrious cityscape.

Provenance
The painting previously belonged to Barbra Streisand, acquired around 1986 for $135,000. On March 3, 1996, Christie's held a dedicated sale of Streisand's collection, including Adam and Eve, which sold for $1,982,500, at the time, setting a record price for the artist at auction. Streisand told the NY Times: "We screamed when the Lempicka price went over $1 million ... I was working out with my exercise teacher and when the bidding went over the top I screamed."

The work is currently in a private collection.

In the media
In December 1993, Architectural Digest featured Barbra Streisand's Art-Deco-inspired Malibu home; the front cover of the issue included an image of Streisand and Adam and Eve.

In 1996, the movie First Wives Club included Adam and Eve. In the film, the painting belongs to Elise Eliot-Atchison, played by Goldie Hawn.

References

1932 paintings
Nude art
Paintings by Tamara de Lempicka
Lempicka